The P2550 is an articulated high-floor electric light rail vehicle produced by AnsaldoBreda (now Hitachi Rail Italy) for the Los Angeles County Metropolitan Transportation Authority's Metro Rail system.

History 
In 2001, the LACMTA began seeking bids for a new order of light rail vehicles. Four companies submitted proposals; Bombardier, Kinki Sharyo, Siemens, and AnsaldoBreda. Siemens's proposal did not meet the LACMTA's requirements, and Bombardier declined to bid due to the terms of the contract. AnsaldoBreda's bid was lower than that of Kinki Sharyo, and as a result, on April 24, 2003, the LACMTA awarded a contract to AnsaldoBreda for the production of 50 new light rail vehicles. The first of these vehicles were delivered in 2005 and was first tested on the Blue Line before becoming exclusive to the Gold Line.

Delivery of the vehicles was approximately three years behind schedule, and Metro claimed they were overweight; thus, the agency chose not to exercise their option to purchase more beyond this initially contracted order.

In March 2021 it was found Kinki Sharyo was planned to refurbish the vehicles.

See also 
 Nippon Sharyo P865
 Siemens P2000
 Kinki Sharyo P3010

References 

Los Angeles Metro Rail
Light rail in California
750 V DC multiple units
Electric multiple units of the United States
Train-related introductions in 2007
AnsaldoBreda multiple units
AnsaldoBreda trams
Light rail vehicles
Articulated passenger trains